The 2017 Kazakhstan Premier League was the 26th season of the Kazakhstan Premier League, the highest football league competition in Kazakhstan. Astana are the defending champions having won their third league championship the previous year.

On 23 December 2016, a league format change was announced. The previous system of 22 regular season games followed by 10 games in the championship (top six) or relegation (bottom six) round was discontinued. Instead, the teams played 33 games over three rounds, with at least one home game and one away game against each opponent. These 33 games alone decided the champion, European participants and relegation.

Teams
FC Zhetysu and FC Taraz were relegated at the end of the 2016 season, and were replaced by FC Kaisar and FC Altai Semey. However, on 3 February 2017, the Football Federation of Kazakhstan ruled that Altai Semey did not meet the required entry requirements for the Premier League, and ruled that FC Taraz will replace them for the 2017 season.

Team overview

Personnel and kits

Note: Flags indicate national team as has been defined under FIFA eligibility rules. Players and Managers may hold more than one non-FIFA nationality.

Foreign players
The number of foreign players is restricted to eight per KPL team. A team can use only five foreign players on the field in each game.

In bold: Players that have been capped for their national team.

Managerial changes

League table

Results

Games 1–22

Games 23–33

Relegation play-offs

Statistics

Scoring
 First goal of the season: Aleksey Shchotkin for Tobol against Atyrau (8 March 2017)

Top scorers

Hat-tricks

References

External links
Official website 

Kazakhstan Premier League seasons
1
Kazakh
Kazakh